Janai Road railway station  is a railway station on the Howrah–Bardhaman chord of Howrah Railway division of the Eastern Railway zone. It is located in Hooghly district in the Indian state of West Bengal.

References

Railway stations in Hooghly district
Howrah railway division
Kolkata Suburban Railway stations
Railway stations opened in 1917